Pierre Fassnacht (born 26 January 1996) is a German footballer who plays as a defender for Rot-Weiß Oberhausen.

Career
Fassnacht made his professional debut for Carl Zeiss Jena in the 3. Liga on 9 February 2019, starting in the home match against Karlsruher SC.

References

External links
 Profile at DFB.de
 Profile at kicker.de

1996 births
Living people
People from Mühlacker
Sportspeople from Karlsruhe (region)
Footballers from Baden-Württemberg
German footballers
Germany youth international footballers
Association football defenders
Karlsruher SC II players
SSV Ulm 1846 players
1. FC Saarbrücken players
FC Carl Zeiss Jena players
Rot-Weiß Oberhausen players
3. Liga players
Regionalliga players
21st-century German people